Harano Din (English: The Lost Days) is a 1961 East Pakistani Bengali-language film directed by Mustafiz and starring Shabnam and Ghulam Mustafa in the lead roles. Mustafiz's brother Ehtesham produced the movie. Ferdousi Rahman crooned the evergreen hit song "Ami Rupnagarer Rajkanya", composed by Robin Ghosh.

Story
Mala is a snake charmer's daughter. Rich landlord Bashir Chowdhury has his evil eyes on her. He tried to rape her, but Mala escapes.

Cast 
 Shabnam as Mala (snake charmer's daughter)
 Rahman as Bashur Chowdhury
 Subhash Dutta

Music
The film's music was composed by Robin Ghosh.

References

Further reading

External links
 

1961 films
Bengali-language Pakistani films
Films scored by Robin Ghosh
1960s Bengali-language films